Jean-Baptiste Chaigneau (1769–1832) was a French Navy sailor and an adventurer who played an important role in Vietnam in the 19th century. He served the Nguyễn dynasty from 1794 to 1819, and 1821 to 1826, and took the Vietnamese name of Nguyễn Văn Thắng (阮文勝).

Role in Vietnam

Jean-Baptiste Chaigneau was among the soldiers who were gathered by Father Pierre Pigneau de Behaine to support the efforts of Nguyễn Phúc Ánh to conquer Vietnam. He came to Vietnam with Pigneau in 1794. Chaigneau supported the offensives of Nguyễn Ánh, such as the 1801 naval offensive in Thi Nai.

Once Nguyễn Ánh became emperor Gia Long, Chaigneau remained at the court to become a mandarin. Chaigneau received the title of truong co, together with Philippe Vannier, de Forsans and Despiau, meaning second-class second-degree military mandarins, and later received the title of Grand Mandarin once Gia Long became emperor, with personal escorts of 50 soldiers. He also married into a Vietnamese Catholic mandarin family, as did Vannier or Laurent Barizy. He married Ho Thi Hue, of the Ho Catholic family.

Chaigneau became a Counsellor to Emperor Gia Long under the Vietnamese name of Nguyen Van Thang. From 1816, he was in relation with the French Foreign Minister Armand-Emmanuel du Plessis, Duc de Richelieu.

Chaigneau then traveled to France on the Henri in 1819, and returned to Vietnam in 1821, as the French consul in Huế (he was the first French Consul in Cochinchina), with mission to obtain more trade privileges for France. He offered to Emperor Minh Mạng a peace treaty with France, but this was rejected. Discouraged, he left Vietnam in 1824.

In 1826, his nephew Eugène Chaigneau was sent to Vietnam to replace him as Consul, but Eugène was denied any audience with the Emperor.

Chaigneau had a son, Nguyen Van Duc, also known as Michel Duc Chaigneau, who wrote a memoir on his early life in Huế (Souvenirs de Huế) and played a role in the embassy of Phan Thanh Gian to France in 1863. In France, he became a commissioner for the Ministry of Finance. Another of his sons, Jean Chaigneau, also a half-Vietnamese, later became secretary general of the city of Rennes.

Depictions
Two depictions of Chaigneau are known: one in which he wears rather Westernized clothing, which is actually a paintover of an original painting in which he wears distinctly Vietnamese clothing, which was discovered underneath after restoration. The original painting, probably painted around 1805 when Chaigneau was about 35, is strongly reminiscent of the uniforms worn by the armies of the soldiers of Emperor Gia Long. Beneath his blue jacket, Chaigneau wears a full Vietnamese dress of red color, with small flowers (visible on the pair of trousers) which suggests a member of the Imperial family (as other French officers, Chaigneau apparently received the honour of being considered a part of the Imperial family). The roll he wears in his right probably indicates the Madarinal roll he received from the emperor.

Works
Mémoire sur la Cochinchine (Memoir on Cochin China), 1820

See also
France–Vietnam relations

Notes

References 

 

 

 

1769 births
1832 deaths
French soldiers
Military history of Vietnam
Generals of the Nguyễn lords
Nguyen dynasty officials
Military personnel from Lorient
French expatriates in Vietnam
French Protestants